Calender Meadows is a  biological Site of Special Scientific Interest north of Guilsborough in Northamptonshire.

This is described by Natural England as "a nationally important site for its lowland unimproved neutral grassland". It has a wide variety of native herbs and grasses. There are herbs such as lady's bedstraw, meadow vetchling and common bird's-foot trefoil, and grasses include red fescue, sweet vernal-grass and false oat-grass.

The site is private land with no public access.

References

Sites of Special Scientific Interest in Northamptonshire